CETEP City University is a privately owned higher institution located in Yaba, a suburb of Lagos State, Southern-Western Nigeria. The University offers degree courses at undergraduate and postgraduate levels upon its establishment in 2005.

Faculties and Departments 
Faculty of Administration

 Accounting

 Business Administration

 International Relations

 Public Administration

Faculty of Arts And Humanities

 English And Literary Studies

 Performing Arts And Culture

Faculty of Education

 Business Education

 Education & Computer Science

 Education & Economics

 Education & Mathematics

 Education & Physics

 Education And Biology

 Education And Chemistry

 Education And English Language

 Education And Social Studies

 Educational Management

 Guidance & Counselling

 Physical And Health Education

Faculty of sciences

 Biochemistry

 Biology

 Chemistry

 Computer Science And Information Science

 Computer Science With Economics

 Computer With Electronics

 Library And Information Science

 Microbiology

 Physics

Faculty of Social Sciences

 Economics

 Entrepreneurship

 Mass Communication And Media Technology

 Psychology

 Sociology

Faculty of Law

 Law

See also
 List of universities in Nigeria

References

Universities and colleges in Nigeria
2005 establishments in Nigeria
Educational institutions established in 2005
Buildings and structures in Lagos State
Education in Lagos State
Private universities and colleges in Nigeria